The Timbarra River is a perennial river of the Mitchell River catchment, located in the East Gippsland region of the Australian state of Victoria.

Course and features
The river descends  over its  course; much of which is through forested mountain areas and steep gorges, with a bed of gravel, boulders and mud and numerous pools.

Together with the Nicholson, Tambo, and Mitchell rivers, and their respective drainage basins, including the Timbarra River, the rivers empty into the Gippsland Lakes and flow into Bass Strait.

Ecology and recreation
The Timbarra River is in good environmental condition, and maintains a reliable year-round flow.

Although access to the river is difficult, it remains popular for fishing, especially for the introduced brown trout which spawn naturally in the river without the need for artificial stocking. Native fish found in the river include the vulnerable Australian grayling, the river blackfish, tupong, and eels.

The Swifts Creek School has named one of its sports houses Timbara, after the river.

See also

List of rivers of Australia

References

External links
 
 
 

East Gippsland catchment
Rivers of Gippsland (region)